Winterville or Wintersville may refer to:

 Winterville (band), a British-based blues-rock trio

Places in the United States
 Winterville, Georgia
 Wintersville, Missouri
 Winterville, North Carolina
 Wintersville, Ohio
 Wintersville, Pennsylvania
 Winterville Plantation, Maine
 Winterville site

See also
Winterval, a festival in Birmingham, England, that is often referred to as "Winterville"